Olufemi Adebisi Bamiro (born 16 September 1947) is a Nigerian professor of mechanical engineering and former vice-chancellor of the University of Ibadan.

Early life and education
Olufemi was born on 16 September 1947 in Ijebu-Igbo, Ogun State. He attended Molusi College, Ijebu-lgbo and proceeded to Government College, Ibadan, obtaining the best result of the year at the Cambridge Higher School Certificate (Advanced Level), 1967. Afterwards he proceeded as Shell Scholar to the University of Nottingham, Nottingham, England, earning a Bachelor of Science (B.Sc.) degree in mechanical engineering with First Class Honours in 1971. He worked briefly for Shell-BP in Nigeria as pipeline engineer before proceeding to McGill University, Montreal, Canada on Canadian Commonwealth Scholarship, where he obtained PhD degree in 1975 after two and a half years. He returned to Nigeria to commence academic work at University of Ibadan in 1975 and rose rapidly to become the first professor of mechanical engineering in the university in 1983. He is a recognized expert in issues related to science and technology policy, higher education, entrepreneurship studies, and information technology. He also has several publications on micromechanics and technology development in local and international journals.

Selected publications
Engineering Mechanics for engineering programmes in universities and polytechnics;
The Pains and Gains of Growth: Case Studies in Entrepreneurship with Prof Albert Alos, the former Vice-Chancellor, Pan-African University, Lagos.
Mechanics and Strength of Deformable Materials published by the Tertiary Education Trust Fund (TETFund).
Introductory Technology for Schools and Colleges

Academic posts
Sub-Dean (General), Faculty of Technology, 1977-1979
Sub-Dean (Postgraduate), 1982-1983.
Head of Mechanical Engineering Department(1983-1985) 
Dean of the Faculty of Technology. 
Chairman for the implementation of water supply plan for the University. 
Director of the Management Information System (MIS) Unit
Deputy vice-chancellor (administration) (2004-2005). 
Vice-Chancellor,December 1, 2005 to November 30, 2010.
Chairman of Lagos Research and Development Council.

He also participated in programmes with the University of Nairobi, Kenya and the University of Zimbabwe, Harare. With expertise in science and technology policy issues, Entrepreneurship Studies, and Information Technology, he served as Consultant to several companies in both the private and public sectors of the Nigeria’s economy as well as International Agencies.

Professional bodies
Member of the National Energy Panel that produced energy policy for Nigeria in 1984; 
Member of the Implementation Committee of the National Science and Technology Policy (NSTP). (1987); 
Member of the Permanent Site Development Committee of the University of Agriculture, Abeokuta.  (1988);
Member of the Governing Council, Ogun State Polytechnic, Abeokuta; 
Head of the Nigerian Delegation of the Scientists that visited Iran from August 14‑28, 1990 in respect of Memorandum of Understanding in Science and Technology between Nigeria and the Islamic Republic of Iran;
Member of the Planning Committee and the Chief Rapporteur of the first Technology Summit by NSE held in 1997 and others
Vice-Chairman of the Executive Board of the Pan-African Competitiveness Forum (PACF) and the Chairman of the PACF 
He was also involved with the project on sustainable financing for higher education sponsored by Macauthur foundation and World bank.

Honours and awards
 Association of Mechanical Engineering Academic Session Award in 1999
 Nigerian Society of Engineers Merit Award and the United Nations Human Settlement (UN-Habitat) Best Practice Award in respect of the Organo-Mineral Fertiliser Plant Design and Construction Project.
 Fellow of the Nigerian Academy of Science (FAS),
 Fellow of the Nigerian Society of Engineers (FNSE)
 Fellow of the Nigerian Solar Energy Society (FSESN).
Fellow of the Nigerian Academy of Engineering

Personal life
He married Olayinka Gladys Banjo in 1973. They have four children.

References

1947 births
Living people
People from Ogun State
Government College, Ibadan alumni
Nigerian mechanical engineers
Academic staff of the University of Ibadan
Alumni of the University of Nottingham
McGill University Faculty of Engineering alumni
Federal University of Agriculture, Abeokuta people
Academic staff of Moshood Abiola Polytechnic
Vice-Chancellors of the University of Ibadan
Nigerian educational theorists
Nigerian educators